The House of Mniszech (plural: Mniszchowie, historical feminine forms: Mniszchówna (unmarried), Mniszchowa (married or widow)) was a Polish magnate and noble family bearing the Mniszech Coat of Arms.

Notable members
 Andrzej Jerzy Mniszech (1823–1905), painter
  (died c. 1569)
 Franciszek Bernard Mniszech
 Jan Karol Wandalin Mniszech	
 Jan Mniszech
 Jerzy August Mniszech
 Jerzy Jan Wandalin Mniszech
 Jerzy Mniszech (c. 1548–1613), starost of Lwów,  voivode of Sandomierz
 Julia Teresa Wandalin-Mniszech
 Józef Jan Wandalin Mniszech
 Józef Wandalin Mniszech
 Józefina Amalia Mniszech (1752–1798), wife of Stanisław Szczęsny Potocki
 Ludwika Mniszech
 Maria Amalia Mniszchowa (1736–1772)
 Maryna Mniszchówna (c. 1588–1614), Tsaritsa of Russia
 Michał Jerzy Wandalin Mniszech  (1742–1806), Marshal of the Court of Lithuania and Grand Marshal of the Crown
  (1484–1553)
 Stanisław Bonifacy Mniszech
 Stanisław Jerzy Wandalin Mniszech
 Urszula Mniszchówna

Palaces

Bibliography
 Kossakowski S. K., 1860, Monografie historyczno-genealogiczne niektórych rodzin polskich, t. 2, Warszawa.
 Leitgeber S., 1993, Nowy Almanach Błękitny, Oficyna Wydawnicza „Audiutor”, Poznań-Warszawa.
 Zielińska T, 1997, Poczet polskich rodów arystokratycznych, WSiP, Warszawa.